Trawniki  is a village (German: Trawnig, changed between 1934 and 1938 to Grünweide) in the administrative district of Gmina Pawłowiczki, within Kędzierzyn-Koźle County, Opole Voivodeship, in south-western Poland.

References

Trawniki